Robert Hugh Priestley (23 November 1911 – 30 November 2007) was an English first-class cricketer.

Priestly was born at Maida Vale to Hugh Priestley and his wife, Elizabeth Grainger Hall. He was educated at Winchester College. He made one appearance in first-class cricket for the Free Foresters against Cambridge University at Cambridge in 1932. Batting twice in the match, Priestley was dismissed without scoring by Rodney Rought-Rought in the Free Forester's first-innings, while in their second-innings he was dismissed by the same bowler for 16 runs.

He married Mary Hermia, daughter of Sir George Menteth Boughey, 9th Bt in 1935, with the couple having three children. He died one week after his 96th birthday in November 2007 at Oakley, Hampshire.

References

External links

1911 births
2007 deaths
People from Maida Vale
People educated at Winchester College
English cricketers
Free Foresters cricketers
People from Oakley, Hampshire